Ronzoni is a surname. Notable people with the surname include:

José Perotti Ronzoni (1898–1956), Chilean sculptor
Pietro Ronzoni (1781–1861), Italian painter

See also
New World Pasta
Ebro Foods#Ronzoni
Ethel Ronzoni Bishop
Luther Vandross

Italian-language surnames